Kingslee Fernandes (born 26 January 1998) is an Indian professional footballer who plays as a midfielder for Churchill Brothers in the I-League.

Career
Born in Goa, Fernandes started his career with Vasco, playing for their youth side. Fernandes also played for the Vasco senior side in the Goa Professional League. Fernandes was also selected for the Goa side that would participate in the Santosh Trophy but for unknown reasons, did not appear at training camp.

Churchill Brothers
In December 2016 it was revealed that Fernandes had signed with Churchill Brothers for the club's return to the I-League. He made his professional debut for the side on 8 January 2017 in their opening match against Mohun Bagan. Despite his side losing 1–0, Fernandes still played the full match and earned the Hero of the Match award for his performance.

FC Goa
Fernandes then joined the reserves side of FC Goa.

He was promoted to the senior team in the year 2019.

Career statistics

Club

Honours
Churchill Brothers
Baji Rout Cup runner-up: 2022

Notes

References

Living people
Indian footballers
Vasco SC players
Churchill Brothers FC Goa players
Association football midfielders
Footballers from Goa
Goa Professional League players
I-League players
FC Goa players
Indian Super League players
1998 births